The 2013 Internationaux de Tennis de BLOIS is a professional tennis tournament played on clay courts. It is the first edition of the tournament which is part of the 2013 ATP Challenger Tour. It takes place in Blois, France between 10 and 16 June 2013.

Singles main draw entrants

Seeds

 1 Rankings are as of May 27, 2013.

Other entrants
The following players received wildcards into the singles main draw:
  Maxime Hamou
  Alexis Musialek
  Mathieu Rodrigues
  Maxime Teixeira

The following players received entry from the qualifying draw:
  Máximo González
  Guillermo Olaso
  Laurent Rochette
  Alexander Ward

The following player received entry as a lucky loser:
  Carlos Salamanca

Champions

Singles

  Julian Reister def.  Dušan Lajović 6–1, 6–7(3–7), 7–6(7–2)

Doubles

  Jonathan Eysseric /  Nicolas Renavand def.  Ruben Gonzales /  Chris Letcher 6–3, 6–4

External links
Official Website

Internationaux de Tennis de BLOIS
Internationaux de Tennis de Blois